is a 2001 eroge developed by Guilty. Peach Princess published the game in North America.

A hentai OVA was produced by Digital Works and released by JVD months after the game was released. The same plot and characters were used.

Plot
The story starts off with Yusuke's Mother slowly stripped her clothes one by one in front of a bespectacled middle aged gentleman who quietly observed, showing her naked body to the latter who remained stoic and silent. The scene change to their foreplay where the mysterious man started groping the rich, enormous and beautiful breasts of Yusuke's mother to arouse her which he relished as he licked and taste her nipples for some time before he started fingering her vagina, as she started to feel anxious, the man reminded her she is no longer a virgin, and told her to relax a little more and enjoyed the foreplay which she complied.

The scene changed to a sleeping Yusuke having another memory of witnessing his mother's adultery where Yusuke's Mother is having extremely passionate sex with the mysterious man, Yusuke's Mother told her sex partner to hurry up and give her an orgasm as her husband is coming back, which the latter agreed but hesitated as Yusuke is in their house which Yusuke's Mother assured as she think her son is out collecting insects leading Yusuke to wake up in shock and sweat.

After some time, where Yusuke's Mother is finally aroused, she gave the mysterious man a blowjob, with an unsatisfied expression told her to be more intense in her sucking and she must improved her sucking technique to prevent her husband from cheating on her. After licking his penis a few times, her teacher proceed to give her a cunnilingus, as he savoured her vagina, he complimented on its tenderness stating that he would never imagined it belong to a woman who had gaven birth to children, which Yusuke's Mother replied it is embarrassing and not to say such things.

As he licked further, Yusuke's Mother climaxed as she groped one of her own wonderful breasts. Slowly and gradually, in a missionary position, the mysterious man insert his penis into Yusuke's Mother's pussy, losing her chastity and having sex with a man for the first time after years. As the man questioned her how does it feel to have a receive a man inside her after a long time, she replied she don't know. As the coitus became more intense, Yusuke's Mother moaned in estactic pleasure first in a doggy style and then again in a missionary position.

Finally to maximize her pleasure the mysterious man in reverse cowgirl position, tightly groped Yusuke's Mother voluptuous breasts as he masterly and intensely thrusted his penis into her vagina to ejaculated inside her womb, he asked is the sex comfortable, she replied yes, as he ejaculated inside her pussy as Yusuke's Mother moaned very loudly.

After a brief toy and oral tryst with his cousin Mio, he contemplates his feelings for his new stepmother and women in general while remembering the time when he first witness his mother's adultery as he heard his mother moaning in the house, he quietly peeked inside the room which to his heartbreaking shock, despair and dismay, his mother is having extremely passionate sex with another man in a doggy style position as loud sounds of copulation produced from the man's penis thrusting her vagina as Yusuke's mother immensely enjoying the adulterous sex and shown to have absolutely no remorse about cheating on her husband as she and her lover constantly moaned  while her enormous breasts were bouncing energetically in unison. As the sex escalate at its most intense; the adulterous lovers climaxed in a creampie in absolute pleasure as Yusuke's Mother and her lover loudly moan with immense ecstasy.

Main Characters

Yusuke Yagami
The main protagonist, Yusuke, is a high student who is traumatized forever after witnessing his mother's adultery during his childhood. Thus, Yusuke held extreme disdain and hatred towards women. 
Desiring to vent his anger and hatred, he targeted his stepmother Misako abusing her as a sex slave.

Mio Shinohara
Yuusuke's cousin Mio is a high school student that goes to the same school as him. She is an honor student who enjoys being a class representative. She's got a calm, relaxed type of personality. She likes putting up a facade of being a "good girl" while in secret she has a hidden side of hers that loves sex. Unlike Yuusuke, Mio is sympathetic towards her aunt whose neglection by her husband in her marriage lead her to find solace in adultery.

Yusuke's Mother
Yusuke's biological mother, a very beautiful and attractive woman with long wavy brown hair and brown eyes. She possess an extremely voluptuous body with enormous breasts which remains untarnished even after giving birth. According to the OVA, despite her immense beauty, Yusuke's Mother was completely neglected by her workaholic husband for several years after their marriage. In an attempt to regain his attention, Yusuke's Mother sought the help of another man to teach her how to seduce her husband by learning to have sex in a skillful manner including foreplay techniques such as giving blowjobs, by having sex with her sex teacher. However, as time pass, Yusuke's mother came to enjoyed the tremendous sexual pleasure of their lovemaking becoming a nymphomaniac, eventually she became lovers wth her sex teacher. Yusuke's mother no longer cared about her husband as she had extremely passionate sex with her mentor daily without any remorse for her adultery, during one of her sex sessions, she unknowingly traumatized Yusuke who discovered her adultery by accident.

Mysterious Gentleman
The unnamed lover of Yusuke's mother. In the OVA, he is shown to be a bespectacled middle aged gentleman with a vigorous and powerful libido who is extremely skilled and experienced in coitus and giving women sexual pleasure. Having vast amount of sexual experience, he taught Yusuke's mother sexual techniques through practical experience, by letting him make love to herself extremely passionately. Yusuke's mother found a new unbreakable love in her teacher due to all the countless time he had spent passionately making love to her and the estactic pleasure that was born from their consensual coitus which is more than enough to satisfy the loneliness she felt from her husband's neglect.

Anime 
A Hentai OVA adaptation was produced by Digital Works and released by JVD months after the game was released. The same plot and characters were used. The OVA also expanded to show and extended the scene of Yusuke's Mother committing her first adultery and explained her reasons for doing so as well as how Yusuke discovered his mother's adultery. The OVA also featured an original ending.

Episode 1 
The Episode begins with a hot summer day, showing a traditional Japanese residence amidst the noisy chirpings of Cicadas. Yusuke's Mother slowly stripped her clothes off one by one in front of the mysterious gentleman who quietly observed, showing her naked body to the latter who remained stoic and silent. The next scene shows Yusuke lying on his bed, uncomfortably sweating as the arousing sounds of a woman's moans could be heard, which is revealed to be Yusuke's Mother as the scene changes, revealing her rich, enormous and beautiful breasts up close, her right breast being tightly groped and squeezed by the mysterious man as he licked the nipple of her left breast which he relished as Yusuke's Mother moaned arousingly. The mysterious man began fingering her vagina as she started to feel anxious. The man's face is shown close up with his spectacles showing a reflection of Yusuke's Mother naked and extremely attractive body. Telling Yusuke's Mother she had already lost her virginity years ago and told her to relax a little more and enjoyed the foreplay. The scene changed to a sleeping Yusuke having another memory of witnessing his mother's adultery where Yusuke's Mother is having extremely passionate sex with the mysterious man, Yusuke's Mother told the mysterious gentleman to hurry up and give her an orgasm as her husband is coming back, which the latter agreed but hesitated as Yusuke is in their house which Yusuke's Mother assured as she think her son is out collecting insects leading Yusuke to wake up in shock and sweat.

The next scene shows Yusuke's Mother sweating while covering her mouth with a finger as the Mysterious Gentleman while fingering her vagina moved closer to her face preparing to kiss her. After the two kissed each other offscreen, Yusuke's Mother is shown sucking a penis which becomes wet with her saliva as it changes again showing a naked Mysterious Gentleman and a naked Yusuke's Mother bending down on all four in front of the Mysterious Gentleman with her voluptuous breasts hanging, giving him a blowjob next to a bed. Finding her sucking technique to be unsatisfying and mediocre, he calmly told her that she must be more intense in her sucking, that she must master her fellatio technique if she does not want her husband to cheat on her, as Yusuke's Mother continued to obediently suck his penis. After licking his penis a few times, the mysterious gentleman proceed to give her a cunnilingus, as he savoured her vagina, he complimented on its tenderness stating that he would never imagined it belong to a woman who had gaven birth to children, which Yusuke's Mother replied it is embarrassing and not to say such things. It then shows the Mysterious Gentleman continued to lick upclosed as Yusuke's Mother become increasingly aroused, eventually Yusuke's Mother moaned extremely loudly bending backwards while groping her wonderful and enormous right breast with her left hand as she continued moaning while salivating with her tongue out. Finally, Yusuke's Mother lied down panting on the bed as the Mysterious Gentleman began to slowly and gradually insert his penis into Yusuke's Mother's vagina as she moaned. The mysterious gentleman's penis is fully inserted as Yusuke's Mother sighed with a complicated expression of relaxation and confusion. The Mysterious Gentleman's Penis began to thrust deep inside Yusuke's Mother's Vagina, briefly pulling out before thrusting in again repeatedly as Yusuke's moaned in ecstatic pleasure first in a doggy style position where Yusuke Mother bends on all four with her beautiful breasts hanging and later switch to a missionary position where Yusuke's Mother lied down on the bed as the Mysterious Gentleman's Penis thrusting into her vagina. Finally, the two have sex in a reverse cowgirl position, the Mysterious Gentleman tightly groped Yusuke's Mother's voluptuous breasts as he intensively thrusting his penis into her vagina. Yusuke's Mother continued to moaned until the Mysterious Gentleman ejaculated inside her Vagina, releasing his hands on Yusuke's Mother's voluptuous breasts as she make one last and very loud moan in sheer pleasure as she laid back down as her enormous breasts spouted up many drops of sweat which sparkle brilliantly in the light, brightly and further accenting the immense beauty of Yusuke's Mother's breasts.

While having a brief oral sex with his cousin Mio, Yusuke remember how he came to despised women by remembering the day he discovered his mother's adultery. After coming home on a hot summer day, Yusuke walked down the corridor calling for his mother. Eventually Yusuke started hearing the sounds of sexual moans from inside one of the room via slightly opened open Fusuma sliding door which he stopped and peeked inside.

It was the sound of Yusuke's Mother moaning while in the midst of her adultery. The scene showed up close her buttocks as a Penis thrusting was thrusting inside her pussy. Yusuke's Mother moans as she asked the Mysterious Gentleman to thrust his penis in her vagina more intensely, signifying the two has officially become lovers and their sex is now meant to consummate their love. While wearing her socks and panties hanging on the left leg which the Mysterious Gentleman lifted up with his left hand, Yusuke's mother is having extremely passionate sex with the Mysterious Gentleman in a doggy style position, producing wet and loud sounds of copulation from his penis thrusting her vagina in and out non stop as droplets of Yusuke's Mother vaginal discharge is sprayed out from the force of the coitus while showing Yusuke's Mother ‘s enormous yet extremely beautiful and attractive breasts charmingly and energetically bouncing up and down harmoniously in unison. The two adulterous lovers are shown naked and shadowed as they moaned together, Yusuke's Mother perfectly matched her movement with the Mysterious Gentleman in the coitus while bouncing her voluptuous breasts up and down keeping in pace with the Mysterious Gentleman bending his hips and thrusting his penis inside Yusuke's Mother vagina until the sex escalated to its most intense as while bending their backs as the Lovers climaxed in a creampie in absolute pleasure as the Mysterious Gentleman ejaculated inside Yusuke's Mother's Vagina while moaning loudly together with immense ecstasy, echoing as Yusuke's watch on silently shedding heartbroken tears of despair

Further reading

External links
 
 

2001 video games
2001 anime OVAs
Anime 18
Hentai anime and manga
Incest in film
Incest in anime and manga